David Rennie (born in Buffalo, New York) is an American film editor with more than 12 film credits since 1992. Rennie has been elected to membership in the American Cinema Editors.

Selected filmography 

The Sweetest Thing
3 Ninjas
Office Space
The New Guy
Tenacious D in The Pick of Destiny
Idiocracy
3 Ninjas Kick Back

References

External links 

 

American Cinema Editors
Living people
Artists from Buffalo, New York
Year of birth missing (living people)
American film editors